The Lyth Valley is on the edge of the Lake District National Park in Cumbria, England.
It gives its name to an electoral ward (one of 45 in South Lakeland).

The valley is sheltered by limestone hills and enjoys a relatively mild micro-climate for northern England. It is noted for its damson orchards.

Literary associations
Mrs Humphry Ward in her Helbeck of Bannisdale celebrated the valley in springtime, with its "mists of fruit blossoms.  For the damson trees were all out, patterning the valleys".
Margot Robert Adamson, the Scottish Renaissance poet, wrote of this "Wide silent valley/Beneath whose scree-faced hill the sea birds call".
Alfred Wainwright maintained that "The supreme joy of the Lyth valley is its annual springtime renewal", with damson blossom "appearing as white puffs of smoke all over the valley".

Drainage
The flat bottom of the valley was originally bog, but it has been drained for the benefit of farmers. In recent years there has been controversy about the cost of the pumps which keep the valley drained. For some years the pumping has been funded by the Environment Agency, but the Agency decided that its resources would be better deployed on more significant problems in the area. The creation of an Internal drainage board has been discussed as an alternative. The Agency committed itself to keeping the pumping stations in operation until 2020 to allow more time for a decision on how water level management would to be organised in future.

Ecological implications
There have been objections from environmentalists to a drainage regime which does not take account of the valley's contribution to biodiversity.  It is argued that a less intensive drainage scheme would benefit wildlife, and still allow farming or paludiculture.

In 2014 it was reported that 35 ha of wetland habitat was being created in the Lyth Valley on the edge of the Sizergh estate. The project received funding from Natural England as part of a higher level stewardship scheme. It was hoped to attract bittern and other wildlife.

References

Valleys of Cumbria
Wards of Cumbria